The Metrolink Ventura County Line is a commuter rail line serving Ventura County and the San Fernando Valley in Los Angeles County and the City of Los Angeles, in the Southern California system. The line is the successor of the short lived CalTrain commuter rail line.

Schedules

Metrolink trains on the Ventura County Line ran weekdays only until Saturday service was added on May 29, 2021, mostly during peak commuter hours, and so with limited midday service. From Union Station to Downtown Los Angeles: 
East Ventura
six trains total at peak hours, in the peak direction only (3 south-AM; 3 north PM) each weekday, running to East Ventura station (in the community of Montalvo) — northern end of line.
Moorpark
four trains each weekday run to Moorpark Station (far western Simi Valley) — also station for Amtrak Pacific Surfliner. Trains of the six East Ventura runs also stop here.
Chatsworth
three trains each weekday run to Chatsworth Station (western San Fernando Valley) — major transit hub, with the Amtrak Pacific Surfliner, the Metro G Line and Metro Local valley bus lines, the LADOT Commuter Express service; and buses from Santa Clarita Transit, and Simi Valley Transit. Trains of the six East Ventura and four Moorpark runs also stop here.
Airport
All 17 trains per weekday from Union Station stop at Hollywood Burbank Airport (900 numbered series).
All 16 trains en route to Union Station per weekday stop at Hollywood Burbank Airport.
Only three trains per day originate in East Ventura. The remaining 13 trains originate from different points along the Ventura County Line.

Other service
Service is augmented during midday and on weekends by the Amtrak Pacific Surfliner line, serving most of the Metrolink stations on the Ventura County Line.

Airport
Additional airport shuttle service operates between Union Station and Burbank Airport–South station as the Hollywood Burbank Airport Line—BUR. Metrolink numbers Airport Line trains in the 900 series.

Tracks
The line operates between Moorpark and Los Angeles Union Station on tracks owned by the Los Angeles County Metropolitan Transportation Authority – the Ventura Subdivision from Moorpark to Burbank Airport and the Valley Subdivision, the Valley Subdivision from Burbank to Glendale, becoming the River Subdivision into Los Angeles Union Station. It uses the Coast Line of the Union Pacific Railroad between Moorpark and Oxnard and into Ventura where the Santa Paula Branch splits from the rest of the Coast Line. The East Ventura station and layover facility are on the Santa Paula Branch Line.

History

The railway was originally constructed by the Southern Pacific Railroad as their Coast Line, connecting Los Angeles to San Francisco. The Montalvo Cutoff between Burbank and Ventura via the Simi Valley was built in 1904, bypassing the old line further to the north. Caltrans ran commuter rail service over the line very briefly in 1982 and 1983, but CalTrain was unsustainable due to a number of factors.

In 1990 the Los Angeles County Transportation Commission, predecessor of Los Angeles County Metropolitan Transportation Authority, acquired a portion of the right of way between Los Angeles and Moorpark from Southern Pacific and transferred it to the newly formed Southern California Regional Rail Authority for commuter service. 

The line began operations in 1992 as one of Metrolink's original three routes, with service from Moorpark to Los Angeles Union Station in Downtown Los Angeles. Service was extended to Camarillo and Oxnard in 1994 after the Northridge earthquake, then to East Ventura in 2002.

Because Amtrak trains operate on the same corridor all day, every day, Metrolink did not operate weekend service on the line. As part of a six-month trial program to determine demand, Metrolink added Saturday service on April 6, 2020. Permanent Saturday service started on May 29, 2021, with one round trip between LA Union Station and Moorpark. Service was extended to Ventura–East on August 9, 2021. 

Metrolink established a code sharing agreement with Amtrak, allowing all Metrolink passengers to ride select Pacific Surfliner trains with any ticket or pass, starting April 4, 2022. The code sharing agreement adds one more morning and early afternoon trip to Ventura, expanding midday and Saturday service, and establishing defacto Sunday service on the line.

Accidents

2008 Chatsworth train collision

At 4:23 p.m. on September 12, 2008, 25 people were killed in a collision between Metrolink commuter train 111 and a freight train. At least 130 people were injured, with at least one dying later at a hospital. The crash occurred on the Ventura County Line near Heather Lee Lane, south of the Ronald Reagan Freeway(SR-118) and east of Topanga Canyon Boulevard.  Both locomotives, the leading car of the commuter train, and seven cars of the freight train were derailed.

2015 Oxnard train derailment

On February 24, 2015, according to Oxnard Police Sergeant Denise Shadinger, a Metrolink commuter train traveling from Ventura County to Los Angeles hit a road vehicle near Oxnard, California; she initially said there was an unspecified number of injuries. The incident was reported at 5:44 A.M. Three cars derailed, at least one vehicle was fully engulfed at some point, and the three derailed cars were on their sides; the locomotive was still upright. Little but scorched, mangled wreckage in an intersection and on the tracks was left of the truck; Oxnard Fire Department battalion chief Sergio Martinez said the driver fled the scene unhurt but was found and taken into custody. News helicopters and footage from ABC affiliate KABC showed footage of triage tarps lying in the 5th Street (SR 34) where on-scene firefighters were treating victims and monitoring the scene. The National Transportation Safety Board (NTSB), in a tweet, acknowledged the incident and stated they were launching an investigation. The train engineer died a week later and 29 others were injured. A week after the incident, an Amtrak train collided with a vehicle in the same area as the first crash.

Stations

Notes

References

External links

 
Metrolink Schedules
Ventura County Line Route Map — on OpenStreetMap

Airport rail links in the United States
Metrolink (California) lines
Public transportation in Los Angeles
Public transportation in Los Angeles County, California
Public transportation in Ventura County, California
Railway lines opened in 1992
Transportation in the San Fernando Valley
1992 establishments in California